Helena is a ghost town in unincorporated Trinity County, California, United States. State Route 299 runs right past the former town to the south; East Fork Road connects the highway to Helena.

History
The community was settled in 1851 as a mining camp on the site of an old Chimariko village. It was known as Bagdad, North Fork, and The Cove before its post office opened in 1891; the post office was named Helena after the postmaster Mr. Meckel's wife  to avoid confusion with another California community called North Fork.

John and Christian Meckel, who moved to the area and established a home on a group of mining claims that totaled 160 acres. In 1854, the Meckels opened a general merchandise store and later a hotel. The town was first known as North Fork, but it was popularly known as “Bagdad,” a name given to the settlement reportedly because it was as rowdy and bizarre as the ancient city with the same name on the Tigris River.

In 1859 the Meckel brothers built and operated a brewery in Helena, then called North Fork.

In 1923, the final stretch of road was built from Helena to South Fork, which connects it to the coast.

When the gold mining dried up, the town soon followed, with slight upticks during the Great Depression. When State Route 299 was completed in 1931, it ended the necessity of the town as it was now being bypassed. The entire town was then bought by F. I. DiNapoli in 1966 for $50,000.

In 1984, Helena was added to the National Register of Historical Places.

Current status

Today, Helena is abandoned and owned by the trustee of a deceased businessman from San Jose. The Currie Cottage (1859), the Meckel Store (1858), the Shlomer Brick Building (1859), The Shlomer Feed Stable (1860), the Meckel Barn (1860), and a rental building built in the 1930s remain.

See also
Helena Fire
List of ghost towns in California
National Register of Historic Places listings in Trinity County, California

References

Unincorporated communities in California
Unincorporated communities in Trinity County, California
1851 establishments in California